Suryya Bhopali is a Pakistani musical romantic film directed by Hassan Tariq who also wrote the screenplay. It stars Rani in titular role opposite Shahid with Waheed Murad in a supporting role. The film follows the romance of a qawali singress from Bhopal with son of a Nawab when she comes to perform at Nawab. The song of the film "Tha Yaqeen Ke Ayainge" became so popular. The music was composed by A. Hameed with songs performance by Mehdi Hassan and Nahid Akhtar. In 2016, Lok Virsa Museum screened the film as part of special showcase of the feature films in the country.

Cast 
 Rani Begum as Surraya Bhopali
 Shahid as Nawabzada Yousuf
 Waheed Murad as Dildar
 Husna as Shehla
 Aslam Pervaiz
 Allauddin
 Talish

Music

References 

Pakistani romantic musical films